The Prix de Rome is an award for architects from the Canada Council for the Arts

Established in 1987, the Prix de Rome is awarded to an architect or group of architects. Two annual awards are made: the Prix de Rome for professional architecture and the Prix de Rome in Architecture for Emerging Practitioners. 

From 1987 to 2003 the award included a residency in a John Shnier-designed laureates' apartment in the Trastevere district of Rome.  The professional award currently consists of a $50,000 cash award, and the Emerging Practitioner award a $34,000 cash award.

Due to uncertainty about travel restrictions due to the COVID-19 pandemic, the 2020 prizes were postponed to 2021, when two winners will be selected.

Recipients

Professional
 1987 - John Shnier (Inaugural Prix de Rome) 
 1988 - Jacques Rousseau  
 1990 - Sophie Charlebois 
 1991 - Dereck Revington 
 1992 - John McMinn 
 1993 - Hal Ingberg 
 1994 - Anthony Robins 
 1995 - Philip Beesley 
 1996 - Philippe Lupien 
 1997 - Pierre Thibault 
 1998 - Atelier Big City 
 1999 - Peter Yeadon 
 2000 - Jason King & George Yu 
 2001 - Atelier In Situ 
 2002 - Marc Boutin 
 2003 - Andrew King 
 2004 - Michael Carroll & Danita Rooyakkers of Atelier BUILD 
2005 - Eric Bunge of nARCHITECT 
 2006 - Kobayashi + Zedda Architects Ltd.
 2007 - Manon Asselin and Katsuhiro Yamazaki of Atelier TAG
 2008 - Pierre Bélanger 
2009 - RVTR 
 2010 - Lola Shepard & Mason White of Lateral Office 
 2011 - Susan Fitzgerald 
 2012 - WilliamsonChong 
2013 - 5468796 Architecture 
 2014 - Omar Gandhi
 2015 - Public Architecture + Communication
 2016 - In 2016, Heather Dubbeldam of Dubbeldam Architecture and Design was awarded the Prix de Rome along with 50,000$ to travel to Denmark, Norway and Sweden to experience first hand net zero, passive and regenerative homes in a similar northern climate in order to develop a thesis on sustainability which she entitled ‘The Next Green – Innovation in Sustainable Housing’. 
 2017 - KANVA 
 2018 - Acre Architects 
 2019 - Neeraj Bhatia

Emerging Practitioner
 2005 - Taymoore Balbaa  
 2006 - Michael Acht 
 2007 - Michaela MacLeod  
2008 - Drew Sinclair 
 2009 - Kelly Nelson Doran 
 2010 - Elizabeth Paden 
 2011 - Samantha Lynch 
2012 - Jason Tsironis 
 2013 - Brett MacIntyre 
 2014 - Jerome Lapierre 
 2015 - Nicole Reckziegel 
 2016 - Yves Patrick Poitras 
 2017 - Piper Bernbaum 
 2018 - David Verbeek 
 2019 - Kinan Hewitt

References

Canadian awards
Architecture awards
Awards established in 1987